The 2016 Queensland Firebirds season saw the Queensland Firebirds netball team compete in the 2016 ANZ Championship. With a team coached by Roselee Jencke, captained by Laura Geitz and featuring Romelda Aiken, Clare McMeniman and Kim Ravaillion, Firebirds won the Australian Conference, the Challenge Trophy and the overall championship. Firebirds became the first and only team to retain the title. In a repeat of 2015, Firebirds defeated New South Wales Swifts in both the Australian Conference Final and the Grand Final.

Players

Player movements

2016 roster

Debutants
 Hulita Haukinima made her ANZ Championship and Firebirds debut in the Round 1 match against Mainland Tactix.
 Chelsea Lemke made her ANZ Championship and Firebirds debut in the Round 6 match against . She came on for the injured Gretel Tippett and subsequently scored 10 from 13.

Milestones
 Romelda Aiken scored her 5,000th ANZ Championship goal in the grand final.
 Having previously been members of the 2011 and 2015 Queensland Firebirds teams, Romelda Aiken, Laura Geitz and Clare McMeniman all win their third ANZ Championship.

Pre-season
Between 18 and 20 March 2016, Queensland Firebirds played in a three-day event hosted by Northern Mystics at The Trusts Arena. Other participants included Waikato Bay of Plenty Magic, Southern Steel and Adelaide Thunderbirds.

Regular season

Fixtures and results
Round 1

 
Round 2

Round 3

 
Round 4

Round 5

Round 6

Round 7

Round 8

Round 9

Round 10

 
Round 11

 
Round 12
 received a bye.
Round 13

Round 14

Final standings

Challenge Trophy
 began their defence of the Challenge Trophy in Round 1 against Mainland Tactix. Firebirds were unbeaten at home throughout the season and, as a result, retained the Challenge Trophy.

Finals

Conference Final

Semi-finals

Grand Final

Award winners

Queensland Firebirds Awards

ANZ Championship awards

All Star Team

Australian Netball Awards

Gallery

References

Queensland Firebirds seasons
Queensland Firebirds